Thoropa is a genus of frogs in the family Cycloramphidae. They are endemic to eastern and southeastern Brazil. They are sometimes known as river frogs.

Description, ecology, and behavior
Thoropa are associated with rocks and have cryptic coloration. Their size ranges from small to medium,  in snout–vent length. Male Thoropa are associated with wet rock faces, whereas the females seem to range more widely.

In species where reproduction is known, males are territorial—suitable wet rock faces are a scarce resource. Furthermore, mature male Thoropa feature characteristic clusters of dark spines on the inner portions of the hand. It appears that these are associated with male-male combat, probably in conjunction with territorial disputes. Scratch marks in males, but not in females, support this interpretation.

The eggs are laid on rocks with a thin layer of water. Tadpoles are semiterrestrial and have a depressed shape, long tail, and bulging eyes.

Male T. taophora frogs mate exclusively and repeatedly with two females per season in a polygynous system in which the semiterrestrial tadpoles from both females share the same freshwater seep. The females have a dominance hierarchy, and the males mate more with the dominant female.

Species
The genus contains the following species:
 Thoropa bryomantis Assis, Lacerda, Guimarães, Peixoto, Luna, and Feio, 2021
Thoropa lutzi Cochran, 1938
 Thoropa megatympanum Caramaschi and Sazima, 1984
 Thoropa miliaris (Spix, 1824)
 Thoropa petropolitana (Wandolleck, 1907)
 Thoropa saxatilis Cocroft and Heyer, 1988
 Thoropa taophora (Miranda-Ribeiro, 1923)

References 

 
Cycloramphidae
Amphibian genera
Frogs of South America
Endemic fauna of Brazil
Taxa named by Edward Drinker Cope
Taxonomy articles created by Polbot